Club Voleibol Barcelona also known as CVB Barça is a Spanish women's volleyball club from Barcelona and currently plays in the Spanish Superliga.

History
The club was founded in 1994, following the folding of RCD Espanyol Volleyball team which happened a year earlier. It reached the first Spanish division for the first time in 1998–99. After an agreement made in 2004, the club was absorbed by FC Barcelona, effectively becoming its volleyball department. After years playing outside the first division the club was promoted to the Spanish Superliga in 2011–12. A third place finish in the 2013–14, allowed the team to participate for the first time of a European competition, the 2014–15 CEV Women's Challenge Cup.

Honours
Superliga Femenina 
 Third Place : 2013–14
 Runners Up : 2018–19
Superliga Femenina 2
 Runners Up : 2011–12
 Champion : 2020–21

Seasons results

Team
Season 2016–17, as of March 2017

Notable players
 Nerea Sánchez
 Lara Raspall

References

External links
CVB Barça Voleibol Site 
Catalan Volleyball Federation 
Spanish Volleyball Federation 

Volleyball
Barcelona
Barcelona
Barcelona
Barcelona